Eirenis is a genus of Old World snakes in the family Colubridae.

Species
The genus Eirenis contains the following 23 described species:
Eirenis africanus 
Eirenis aurolineatus 
Eirenis barani , 1988 – Baran's dwarf racer
Eirenis collaris  – collared dwarf racer
Eirenis coronella  – crowned dwarf racer
Eirenis coronelloides 
Eirenis decemlineatus 
Eirenis eiselti  – Eiselt's dwarf racer
Eirenis hakkariensis 
Eirenis kermanensis 
Eirenis levantinus 
Eirenis lineomaculatus 
Eirenis medus 
Eirenis modestus  – Asia Minor dwarf racer
Eirenis nigrofasciatus 
Eirenis occidentalis 
Eirenis persicus 
Eirenis punctatolineatus  – dotted dwarf racer
Eirenis rafsanjanicus 
Eirenis rechingeri 
Eirenis rothii  – Roth's dwarf racer
Eirenis thospitis 
Eirenis yassujicus 

Nota bene: A binomial authority in parentheses indicates that the species was originally described in a genus other than Eirenis.

Distribution
Some of the species within this genus have a narrow geographic distribution; for example, Eirenis mcmahoni occurs only within a single ecoregion along the Afghanistan/Pakistan border, which region is known as the Registan-North Pakistan sandy desert.

References

Further reading
Jan G. 1862. "Enumerazione sistematica degli ofidi appartenenti al gruppo Calamaridae ". Archivo per la Zoologia l'Anatomia e la Fisiologia (Genoa) 2: 213–330. (Eirenis, new genus, p. 256). (in Italian).
Nagy ZT, Schmidtler JF, Joger U, Wink M. 2003. "Systematik der Zwergnattern (Reptilia: Colubridae: Eirenis) und verwandter Gruppen anhand von DNA-Sequenzen und morphologischen Daten ". Salamandra 39 (3/4): 149–168. (in German).

 
Colubrids
Snake genera
Taxa named by Giorgio Jan
Taxonomy articles created by Polbot